Sibusiso Mahlangu (born 17 May 1982) is a South African former professional soccer player who played as a midfielder.

References

External links
Player's profile at absapremiership.co.za

1982 births
Living people
People from Daveyton
Soccer players from Gauteng
South African soccer players
Association football midfielders
Bidvest Wits F.C. players
SuperSport United F.C. players
South African Premier Division players